The SAB C-100 Vulcan (or C 100) is an Italian ultralight and light-sport aircraft produced by SAB Aviation of Benevento. The aircraft is supplied as a kit for amateur construction or as a complete ready-to-fly-aircraft.

Design and development
SAB Aviation purchased Corivi Aviation and their design, the Corivi Pegaso, and the Pegaso was further refined into the C-100 Vulcan.

The Vulcan was designed to comply with the Fédération Aéronautique Internationale microlight rules and US light-sport aircraft rules. It features a cantilever low wing, a two-seats-in-side-by-side configuration enclosed cockpit under a bubble canopy, fixed or optionally retractable tricycle landing gear and a single engine in tractor configuration.

The aircraft is made from sheet aluminum. The standard engine available is the  Rotax 912ULS four-stroke powerplant.

The retractable gear version, with its pneumatic retraction mechanism, is intended for the European microlight market, whereas the fixed gear model is sold in the United States in the LSA category. The LSA version was first shown at Sun 'n Fun in 2010.

The design has been accepted by the Federal Aviation Administration as a special light-sport aircraft.

Specifications (C-100 Vulcan)

References

External links

2000s Italian ultralight aircraft
Homebuilt aircraft
Light-sport aircraft
Single-engined tractor aircraft
Low-wing aircraft